In chess, the move 9.Bc4 is one of the main options in the chess opening called the Yugoslav Attack, which is an attack in the Dragon Variation of the Sicilian Defence. Also known as the Rauzer System or the St George Attack, the Yugoslav Attack begins with the following moves:
 e4 c5
 Nf3 d6
 d4 cxd4
 Nxd4 Nf6
 Nc3 g6
 Be3 Bg7
 f3 O-O
 Qd2 Nc6
 Bc4

English GM John Emms states: I can safely say that the Yugoslav Attack is the ultimate test of the Dragon. White quickly develops his  and castles long before turning his attentions to an all-out assault on the black king. To the untrained eye, this attack can look both awesome and unnerving.

Statistically, Chessgames.com's database of nearly 1500 master games shows win–draw–loss percentages for White to be: 46%–25%–29%. Mega Database 2002 indicates that White scores 52% while 66% of the over 1200 games were decisive.

The ECO code for the Sicilian Dragon, Yugoslav Attack, 9.Bc4 is B77.

Overview

White tries to break open the black  and deliver checkmate down the h-, while Black seeks counterplay on the queenside with sacrificial attacks. Typical white strategies are exchanging dark squared bishops by Be3–h6, sacrificing a pawn and sometimes an exchange on h5, exploiting pressure on the a2–g8 diagonal, and the weakness of the d5-square.

Some typical themes for Black are exchanging White's light-square bishop by ...Nc6–e5–c4, pressure on the c-file, sacrificing the exchange on c3, advancing the b-pawn and pressuring the long diagonal. White will normally conduct a straight pawn attack, because Black has given White a pawn on g6 to attack. Generally, White will avoid moving their pawns on a2/b2/c2, and so Black's pawn storm is nearly always slower than White's. Black can sometimes obtain an acceptable endgame even after sacrificing the exchange, because of White's h-pawn sacrifice and doubled pawns.

The Yugoslav Attack with 9. Bc4 results in extremely tactical and decisive battles. White keeps a firm grip on the center while advancing aggressively towards the enemy king with f3–f4–f5 and even g2–g3–g4. However, danger exists in overextending and allowing Black to gain the initiative with a deadly counterattack. Black's strategy is centered around the half-open c-file and their ability to push the a- and b-pawns. Throughout the entire course of the battle, Black will be looking to break the center with an advance ...d6–d5.

Main line
9... Bd7 10. 0-0-0 
White's most popular choice. In most Yugoslav games, 0-0-0, h4, and Bb3 are all played by White but the move order matters a great deal. 10.h4 h5 transposes to the Soltis Variation but avoids the Chinese Dragon (see below), because after 10.h4 Rb8?! 11.h5! is now good for White. 10.Bb3 also usually transposes into the main lines but Black has the additional possibility of 10...Nxd4 11.Bxd4 b5 which is known as the Topalov System. White's best chances in this line at the moment involve castling short and trying for a positional edge in an atypical fashion in the Yugoslav Attack.

10... Rc8 11. Bb3 
10...Rc8 develops Black's rook to the open c-file, pressuring the queenside and also preparing a discovered attack on White's bishop. To avoid this, White moves the bishop out of the way with 11.Bb3. Black has also tried 10...Qb8, preparing either 11...Rc8 or 11...b5.

11... Ne5 12. Kb1
12.h4 h5, commonly known as the Soltis Variation, is the other main option. There are many ways for White to combat this line, but most of them have been shown to be flawed: if 13.g4?! hxg4, both 14.h5 Nxh5 and 14.f4 Nc4 do little to advance White's attack as Black would be able to keep the kingside closed. White has also tried 13.Bg5 Rc5, but even then the advance of the g-pawn does not promise White much: 14.g4 hxg4 15.f4!? Nc4 16.Qe2 Qc8!, a multi-purpose move which threatens ...Nxb2, increases the pressure on the c-file, prevents f4–f5 and safeguards the passed g4-pawn. In the aforementioned position, Black is better, and the old line proceeds with 14.Kb1 Re8 but theoretically, Black is doing fine. In search of an advantage, White players turned to an immediate 12.Kb1, which is probably the most threatening line at the moment.

12... Re8
After 12.Kb1, Black's most straightforward idea is no longer effective: 12...Nc4 13.Bxc4 Rxc4 can be met with 14.g4 and White has the advantage since with the king on b1, there is no clear way for Black to counterattack. 12...a5 is also fruitless since White can respond by playing 13.a4!, stunting Black's queenside play and creating an outpost on b5. Thus, with no immediate attack available, Black picks the waiting move 12...Re8 which allows Bh6 to be met with ...Bh8, retaining Black's dark-square bishop. 12...Re8 also protects the e7-pawn, so that the queen is no longer tied down to its defence. Another possibility for Black is 12...a6, which has been played by Magnus Carlsen.

Black ...Qa5 lines
The main line runs: 9. Bc4 Bd7 10. 0-0-0 Qa5 11. Bb3 Rfc8 12. h4 Ne5. This approach was originally considered the main variation and was thus given the ECO code B79 (whilst ...Rc8 was not given any). It was advocated by GM Chris Ward in his books Winning with the Dragon and Winning with the Dragon 2.
This line has fallen slightly out of favour due to difficulties encountered in white's 12.Kb1 and the credibility of the Soltis variation in Rc8 lines mentioned above.

Chinese Dragon
The main line with 10. 0-0-0 Rc8 11. Bb3 Ne5 12. Kb1 has proven to be so effective over time that some Dragon players have attempted to dodge the line with the interesting 10... Rb8. This complicated line is known as the Chinese Dragon. The most topical line is currently 11. Bb3 which is really a degree of prophylaxis designed to prevent the sacrifice of the b-pawn immediately whilst buying time for White. Black now has the move 11... Na5 which both threatens to play 12...Nc4 13.Bxc4 bxc4, opening the b-file or just removing the bishop straight off with ...Nxb3. Originally h4 was played in this position, but recently the move 12. Bh6 has come to prominence, leading to a sharp and double-edged game in which Black has good practical chances.

Sample game

Anatoly Karpov–Viktor Korchnoi, 1974 Candidates Final
1.e4 c5 2.Nf3 d6 3.d4 cxd4 4.Nxd4 Nf6 5.Nc3 g6 6.Be3 Bg7 7.f3 Nc6 8.Qd2 0-0 9.Bc4 Bd7 10.h4 Rc8 11.Bb3 Ne5 12.0-0-0 Nc4 13.Bxc4 Rxc4 14.h5 Nxh5 15.g4 Nf6 16.Nde2 Qa5 17.Bh6 Bxh6 18.Qxh6 Rfc8 19.Rd3 R4c5 20.g5 {diagram} Rxg5 21.Rd5 Rxd5 22.Nxd5 Re8 23.Nef4 Bc6 24.e5 Bxd5 25.exf6 exf6 26.Qxh7+ Kf8 27.Qh8+ 1–0

See also
 Sicilian Defence
 Sicilian Defence, Dragon Variation

References

Further reading

External links
ECO B79 Sicilian, Dragon, Yugoslav Attack, 12.h4  Chess ECO Database

Chess openings